An alaia (pronounced) is a thin, round-nosed, square-tailed surfboard ridden in pre-20th century Hawaii. They are distinct from modern surfboards in that they have no ventral fins, and instead rely on the sharpness of the edges to hold the board in the face of the wave.

All of these board types are similar in that each is made of wood and is ridden without a sharks fin/skeg.

History 
The alaia's roots span back a thousand years. Lala is the Hawaiian word describing the action of riding an alaia surfboard. Lala is a word found in the Hawaiian dictionary meaning ‘the controlled slide in the curl when surfing on a board.' Princess Kaʻiulani's alaia board, measuring 7ft 4in long, is preserved at the Bishop Museum.

Alaia boards began making a comeback around 2006 when surfboard-shaper and experimenter Tom Wegener tested prototypes made of paulownia wood among pro-surfers. The first contemporary professional surfers to master the skill of riding an alaia were documented in the Thomas Campbell surf film The Present. This appearance dramatically increased the popularity of the alaia board type. Wegener used Australian surfer Jacob Stuth to test the first models, and over the next several years, he perfected the art of alaia design.

Shaper Donald Takayama furthered this movement with his designs under the Hawaiian Pro Designs label, shaped by Florida native, Brandon Russell.

Materials 
“Ancient Hawaiians made their boards out of local woods–‘ulu, and koa.” Modern Alaia boards are made of many types of wood, including Redwood, Cedar,  Pine and Balsa. Typically, commercially sold alaia boards are made of paulownia.

Paulownia is optimal for crafting surfboards in that it has a good weight to strength ratio, being lighter than other hardwoods and more durable than balsa. It also absorbs less salt water than many other types of wood and therefore does not require a hard resin or glass finish.

Paulownia alaia boards are most often finished with a seed oil to further prevent water absorption and to prevent damage from the drying of salt and sun associated with surfing.

Environmental impact 
Many environmentalists are enthusiastic about the use of paulownia alaia boards because of their minimal impact on the environment, while fiberglass and epoxy surfboards are known for their many pollutants and long decomposition time.

Just sustainable tree farms…the leaves and flowers, is either fed to cattle or the dust and shavings are mulched… Paulownia dust (and shavings) is very good in the garden and breaks down quickly. Worms love it.”

Wegener also states that paulownia is preferable over balsa regarding its impact on human health, because “balsa wood dust hurts your lungs.”
After construction, paulownia boards can be reshaped and repaired without use of more toxic materials. When cared for properly the boards can last a lifetime requiring less manufacturing, and when their usefulness has run out, simply discontinuing oil treatment to the board will allow it to decompose quickly without releasing harmful toxins found in foam and resin into the air and soil.

References

Hawaiiana
Surfing equipment